The gibbous shiner (Cyprinella garmani) is a species of fish in the family Cyprinidae. It is endemic to Mexico.

References

Cyprinella
Taxa named by David Starr Jordan
Fish described in 1885